Krobo Edusei (26 December 1914 – 13 February 1984) was a Ghanaian politician and a high-profile member of Kwame Nkrumah's government. 
He was a popular, outspoken and prominent Ashanti activist and at the forefront of the Ghanaian independence movement, galvanising support amongst the Ashantis for Nkrumah's independence movement. He served as Minister without Portfolio, Minister for Agriculture, Minister for Transport and Communication and Minister for the Interior under Nkrumah.

After Nkrumah - PNP and Limann 

Following the overthrow of Nkrumah's government, Edusei was imprisoned and subsequently released. He continued to be politically active and very influential as a senior member of the People's National Party (PNP), a party formed from the ashes of Nkrumaist CPP; and when the PNP went on to win Ghana's second (the first was won by Dr Kofi Abrefa Busia) post-Nkrumah elections, Edusei became a powerful figure in Hilla Limann's government. 
Following the 1981 overthrow of the Limann government, Edusei was again imprisoned, He was released in 1983 and died of complications from diabetes soon after.

Family 

Krobo Edusei married three times and had numerous children who remain active in the Ghanaian business world. The more well known of his children include prominent millionaire Ghanaian businessman and ports operator, Yaw Krobo Edusei, Lucy Lamptey, former legal director of the Ghanaian government agency Social Security and National Insurance Trust, property entrepreneur and former Coca-Cola executive, Comfort Emden and Catherine Krobo Edusei, entrepreneur, owner and CEO of the Eden Tree brand.

References 

1914 births
1983 deaths
Ghanaian MPs 1954–1956
Ghanaian MPs 1956–1965
Interior ministers of Ghana
Communications ministers of Ghana
Transport ministers of Ghana
Agriculture ministers of Ghana
Convention People's Party (Ghana) politicians
Ghanaian independence activists
Ashanti people
Deaths from diabetes
Prisoners and detainees of Ghana